The Kalmar Union (Danish, Norwegian, and ;) was a personal union in Scandinavia, agreed at Kalmar in Sweden, that from 1397 to 1523 joined under a single monarch the three kingdoms of Denmark, Sweden (then including most of present-day Finland), and Norway, together with Norway's overseas colonies (then including Iceland, Greenland, the Faroe Islands, and the Northern Isles of Orkney and Shetland). 

The union was not quite continuous; there were several short interruptions. Legally, the countries remained separate sovereign states. However, their domestic and foreign policies were directed by a common monarch. Gustav Vasa's election as King of Sweden on 6 June 1523, and his triumphant entry into Stockholm eleven days later, marked Sweden's final secession from the Kalmar Union. Formally, the Danish king acknowledged Sweden's independence in 1524 at the Treaty of Malmö.

Inception 
The union was the work of Scandinavian aristocracy wishing to counter the influence of the Hanseatic League. More personally, it was achieved by Queen Margaret I of Denmark (1353–1412). She was a daughter of King Valdemar IV and had married King Haakon VI of Norway and Sweden, who was the son of King Magnus IV of Sweden, Norway and Scania. Margaret succeeded in having her and Haakon's son Olaf recognized as heir to the throne of Denmark. In 1376 Olaf inherited the crown of Denmark from his maternal grandfather as King Olaf II, with his mother as guardian; when Haakon VI died in 1380, Olaf also inherited the crown of Norway.

Margaret became regent of Denmark and Norway when Olaf died in 1387, leaving her without an heir. She adopted her great-nephew Eric of Pomerania the same year. The following year, 1388, Swedish nobles called upon her help against King Albert. After Margaret defeated Albert in 1389, her heir Eric was proclaimed King of Norway. Eric was subsequently elected King of Denmark and Sweden in 1396 under the banner of the House of Griffin. His coronation was held in Kalmar on 17 June 1397.

One main impetus for its formation was to block German expansion northward into the Baltic region. The main reason for its failure to survive was the perpetual struggle between the monarch, who wanted a strong unified state, and the Swedish and Danish nobility, which did not.

The Union lost territory when Orkney and Shetland were pledged by Christian I, in his capacity as King of Norway, as security against the payment of the dowry of his daughter Margaret, betrothed to James III of Scotland in 1468. The money was never paid, so in 1472 the islands were annexed by the Kingdom of Scotland.

Internal conflict 
Diverging interests (especially the Swedish nobility's dissatisfaction with the dominant role played by Denmark and Holstein) gave rise to a conflict that hampered the union in several intervals starting in the 1430s. The Engelbrekt rebellion, which started in 1434, led to the overthrow of King Erik (in Denmark and Sweden in 1439, as well as Norway in 1442). The aristocracy sided with the rebels. 

King Erik's foreign policy, in particular his conflict with the Hanseatic League, necessitated greater taxation and complicated exports of iron, which in turn may have precipitated the rebellion. Discontent with the nature of King Erik's regime has also been cited as a motivating factor for the rebellion. King Erik also lacked a standing army and had limited tax revenues.

The death of Christopher of Bavaria (who had no heirs) in 1448 ended a period in which the three Scandinavian kingdoms were uninterruptedly united for a lengthy period. Karl Knutsson Bonde ruled as king of Sweden (1448–1457, 1464–1465 and 1467–1470), and Christian of Oldenburg was king of Denmark (1448–1481), Norway (1450–1481) and Sweden (1457–1464). Karl and Christian fought over control of Sweden, Norway, and Denmark, leading Christian to seize Sweden from him from 1457 to 1464 before a rebellion led Karl to become king of Sweden again. When Karl died in 1470, Christian tried to become king of Sweden again, but was defeated by Sten Sture the Elder in the 1471 battle of Brunkeberg outside Stockholm. 

After the death of Karl, Sweden was mostly ruled by a series of "protectors of the realm" (riksföreståndare), with the Danish kings attempting to assert control. First of these protectors was Sten Sture, who kept Sweden under his control until 1497 when the Swedish nobility deposed him. A peasant rebellion led Sture to become regent of Sweden again in 1501. After his death, Sweden was ruled by Svante Nilsson (1504–1512) and then Svante's son Sten Sture the Younger (1512–1520). Sten Sture the Younger was killed in the 1520 Battle of Bogesund when the Danish king Christian II invaded Sweden with a large army. Subsequently, Christian II was crowned King of Sweden, and supporters of Sten Sture were executed en masse in the Stockholm Bloodbath.

Swedish War of Liberation 
After the Stockholm Bloodbath, Gustav Vasa (whose father, Erik Johansson, was executed) travelled to Dalarna, where he organized a rebellion against Christian II. Vasa made an alliance with Lübeck and successfully conquered most of Sweden. He was crowned King of Sweden in 1523, effectively ending the Kalmar Union. After the Northern Seven Years' War, the Treaty of Stettin (1570) saw Frederick II renounce all claims to Sweden.

End and aftermath
One of the last structures of the Union remained until 1536/1537 when the Danish Privy Council, in the aftermath of the Count's Feud, unilaterally declared Norway to be a Danish province. This did not happen. Instead, Norway became a hereditary kingdom in a real union with Denmark. Norway continued to remain a part of the realm of Denmark–Norway under the Oldenburg dynasty for nearly three centuries, until it was transferred to Sweden in 1814. The ensuing union between Sweden and Norway lasted until 1905, when prince Carl of Denmark, a grandson of both the incumbent king of Denmark and the late king of Sweden, was elected king of Norway.

According to historian Sverre Bagge, the Kalmar Union was unstable for several reasons: 

 The power of national aristocracies.
 The varied effects of the Kalmar Union's foreign policy on the three kingdoms. For example, attempted expansions into Northern Germany may have served Danish interests, but was costly to Swedes who had to pay higher taxes and were unable to export iron to the Hanseatic League.
 Geography complicated control of the union in the event of rebellion.
 The large territorial size of the union complicated control.
 Denmark was not strong enough to force Norway and Sweden to stay within the union.

See also
 List of Kalmar Union monarchs
 Scandinavian royal lineage chart for the time around the founding of the Kalmar Union

Notes

References

Further reading
 Albrectsen, Esben, Fælleskabet bliver til. Danmark-Norge 1380–1814, vol. 1, 1380–1536, Oslo: Universitetsforlaget, 1997
 Carlsson, Gottfrid, Medeltidens nordiska unionstanke, Stockholm: Gebers, 1945
 Christensen, Aksel E., Kalmarunionen og nordisk politik 1319–1439, Copenhagen: Gyldendal, 1980
 Enemark, Poul, Fra Kalmarbrev til Stockholms blodbad. Den nordiske trestatsunions epoke 1397–1521, Copenhagen: Nordisk ministerråd/Gyldendal/Liber, 1979
 Harald Gustafsson (2017) The Forgotten Union, Scandinavian Journal of History, 42:5, 560–582.
 Dick Harrison (2020) Kalmarunionen  
 Helle, Knut, ed. The Cambridge History of Scandinavia, Volume 1: Prehistory to 1520 (2003)  excerpt and text search
 Imsen, Steinar. "The Union of Calmar: Northern Great Power or Northern German Outpost?"  in  Christopher Ocker, ed. Politics and Reformations: Communities, Polities, Nations, and Empires (BRILL, 2007)  pp 471–90 online
 Kirby, David. Northern Europe in the Early Modern Period. The Baltic World 1492–1772 (1990)
 Larsson, Lars-Olof, Kalmarunionens tid. Från drottning Margareta till Kristian II, Stockholm: Rabén-Prisma, 1997
 Roberts, Michael. The Early Vasas: A History of Sweden 1523–1611 (1968)

External links
 
 The Kalmar Union – Maps of the Kalmar Union

 
1397 establishments in Europe
14th century in Denmark
14th century in Finland
14th century in Norway
14th century in Sweden
14th-century establishments in Denmark
14th-century establishments in Norway
14th-century establishments in Sweden
1520s disestablishments in Sweden
15th century in Denmark
15th century in Finland
15th century in Norway
15th century in Sweden
16th century in Denmark
16th century in Finland
16th century in Norway
16th century in Sweden
16th-century disestablishments in Denmark
16th-century disestablishments in Norway
Danish monarchy
Kalmar
Norwegian monarchy
Personal unions
Scandinavian history
States and territories established in 1397
Swedish monarchy
Margaret I of Denmark
Former monarchies